María Nieves Panadell Bringués (born 3 July 1956) is a Spanish former swimmer. She competed in the women's 200 metre breaststroke at the 1972 Summer Olympics.

Notes

References

External links
 
 
 
 

1956 births
Living people
Spanish female breaststroke swimmers
Olympic swimmers of Spain
Swimmers at the 1972 Summer Olympics
Place of birth missing (living people)
20th-century Spanish women